Robert Mason (13 May 1901–1981) was an English footballer who played in the Football League for Hartlepools United and Leeds United.

References

1901 births
1981 deaths
English footballers
Association football defenders
English Football League players
Leeds United F.C. players
Bristol Rovers F.C. players
Hartlepool United F.C. players
West Stanley F.C. players